DNA origami is the nanoscale folding of DNA to create arbitrary two- and three-dimensional shapes at the nanoscale. The specificity of the interactions between complementary base pairs make DNA a useful construction material, through design of its base sequences. DNA is a well-understood material that is suitable for creating scaffolds that hold other molecules in place or to create structures all on its own.

DNA origami was the cover story of Nature on March 16, 2006. Since then, DNA origami has progressed past an art form and has found a number of applications from drug delivery systems to uses as circuitry in plasmonic devices; however, most commercial applications remain in a concept or testing phase.

Overview 
The idea of using DNA as a construction material was first introduced in the early 1980s by Nadrian Seeman. The current method of DNA origami was developed by Paul Rothemund at the California Institute of Technology. The process involves the folding of a long single strand of viral DNA (typically the 7,249 bp genomic DNA of M13 bacteriophage) aided by multiple smaller "staple" strands. These shorter strands bind the longer in various places, resulting in the formation of a pre-defined two- or three-dimensional shape. Examples include a smiley face and a coarse map of China and the Americas, along with many three-dimensional structures such as cubes.

To produce a desired shape, images are drawn with a raster fill of a single long DNA molecule. This design is then fed into a computer program that calculates the placement of individual staple strands. Each staple binds to a specific region of the DNA template, and thus due to Watson-Crick base pairing, the necessary sequences of all staple strands are known and displayed. The DNA is mixed, then heated and cooled. As the DNA cools, the various staples pull the long strand into the desired shape. Designs are directly observable via several methods, including electron microscopy, atomic force microscopy, or fluorescence microscopy when DNA is coupled to fluorescent materials.

Bottom-up self-assembly methods are considered promising alternatives that offer cheap, parallel synthesis of nanostructures under relatively mild conditions.

Since the creation of this method, software was developed to assist the process using CAD software. This allows researchers to use a computer to determine the way to create the correct staples needed to form a certain shape. One such software called caDNAno is an open source software for creating such structures from DNA. The use of software has not only increased the ease of the process but has also drastically reduced the errors made by manual calculations.

Applications 

Many potential applications have been suggested in literature, including enzyme immobilization, drug delivery systems, and nanotechnological self-assembly of materials. Though DNA is not the natural choice for building active structures for nanorobotic applications, due to its lack of structural and catalytic versatility, several papers have examined the possibility of molecular walkers on origami and switches for algorithmic computing.  The following paragraphs list some of the reported applications conducted in the laboratories with clinical potential.

Researchers at the Harvard University Wyss Institute reported the self-assembling and self-destructing drug delivery vessels using the DNA origami in the lab tests.  The DNA nanorobot they created is an open DNA tube with a hinge on one side which can be clasped shut.  The drug filled DNA tube is held shut by a DNA aptamer, configured to identify and seek certain diseased related protein.  Once the origami nanobots get to the infected cells, the aptamers break apart and release the drug.  The first disease model the researchers used was leukemia and lymphoma.

Researchers in the National Center for Nanoscience and Technology in Beijing and Arizona State University reported a DNA origami delivery vehicle for Doxorubicin, a well-known anti-cancer drug.   The drug was non-covalently attached to DNA origami nanostructures through intercalation and a high drug load was achieved.  The DNA-Doxorubicin complex was taken up by human breast adenocarcinoma cancer cells (MCF-7) via cellular internalization with much higher efficiency than doxorubicin in free form.  The enhancement of cell killing activity was observed not only in regular MCF-7, more importantly, also in doxorubicin-resistant cells.  The scientists theorized that the doxorubicin-loaded DNA origami inhibits lysosomal acidification, resulting in cellular redistribution of the drug to action sites, thus increasing the cytotoxicity against the tumor cells.

In a study conducted by a group of scientists from iNANO center and CDNA Center at Aarhus university, researchers were able to construct a small multi-switchable 3D DNA Box Origami. The proposed nanoparticle was characterized by AFM, TEM and FRET. The constructed box was shown to have a unique reclosing mechanism, which enabled it to repeatedly open and close in response to a unique set of DNA or RNA keys. The authors proposed that this "DNA device can potentially be used for a broad range of applications such as controlling the function of single molecules, controlled drug delivery, and molecular computing.".

Nanorobots made of DNA origami demonstrated computing capacities and completed pre-programmed task inside the living organism was reported by a team of bioengineers at Wyss Institute at Harvard University and Institute of Nanotechnology and Advanced Materials at Bar-Ilan University.  As a proof of concept, the team injected various kinds of nanobots (the curled DNA encasing molecules with fluorescent markers) into live cockroaches.  By tracking the markers inside the cockroaches, the team found the accuracy of delivery of the molecules (released by the uncurled DNA) in target cells, the interactions among the nanobots and the control are equivalent to a computer system.  The complexity of the logic operations, the decisions and actions, increases with the increased number of nanobots.  The team estimated that the computing power in the cockroach can be scaled up to that of an 8-bit computer.

DNA is folded into an octahedron and coated with a single bilayer of phospholipid, mimicking the envelope of a virus particle.  The DNA nanoparticles, each at about the size of a virion, are able to remain in circulation for hours after injected into mice.  It also elicits much lower immune response than the uncoated particles.  It presents a potential use in drug delivery, reported by researchers in Wyss Institute at Harvard University.

Similar approaches

The idea of using protein design to accomplish the same goals as DNA origami has surfaced as well. Researchers at the National Institute of Chemistry in Slovenia are working on using rational design of protein folding to create structures much like those seen with DNA origami. The main focus of current research in protein folding design is in the drug delivery field, using antibodies attached to proteins as a way to create a targeted vehicle.

See also 

 RNA origami
 DNA nanotechnology
 Molecular self-assembly
 Folding@home
 Origami

References

Further reading 
 

DNA nanotechnology
Genetics techniques